Testify is a remix EP by The Damned, released by Cleopatra Records in 1997.

Composition
The EP consists of remixes of material from their 1996 album Not of This Earth. Among those contributing were the UK Subs (Track 1), Birmingham 6 (Track 2), Claus Larsen (Track 3), Damien Deville of Nosferatu (Track 4), Matt Green (Track 5) and Romell Regulacion (Track 6). A bonus live version of MC5's "Looking at You" recorded at Woolwich Coronet on 11 July 1985, the same gig as Fiendish Shadows live album (but not included on that release) was included as a "bonus track" – something of a misnomer as the EP's never been issued without it.

Release
The EP was initially released in the United States only, but is relatively easy to find imported in the UK, among others. It was later included on Cleopatra's Damned Box Set.

Track listing
All tracks composed by Rat Scabies and Alan Lee Shaw; except where indicated
 "Testify" (UK Subs Mix) – 2:19
 "I Need a Life – Resurrected" (Birmingham 6 Mix) – 4:40
 "Shadow to Fall" (Leæther Strip Mix) – 3:39
 "Testify" (Nosferatu Mix) – 2:57
 "No More Tears" (Spahn Ranch Mix) – 3:58
 "Shadow to Fall – Hypersensitive" (Razed in Black Mix) – 3:00
 "Looking at You" (Live) (MC5) – 3:37

References 

The Damned (band) albums
1997 EPs
Cleopatra Records EPs